Chevette may refer to:

 Chevrolet Chevette, a front-engine, rear-drive subcompact
 Vauxhall Chevette, a supermini car
 "Chevette", the first song on Audio Adrenaline's fourth studio album, Some Kind of Zombie

See also
 Chevrolet Chevelle